Europe Ecology was a green electoral coalition of political parties in France created for the 2009 European elections composed of The Greens and other ecologists and regionalists. For the European Parliament election in 2014, this electoral alliance was renewed.

The coalition was launched on 20 October 2008 with the support of the European Green Party and Daniel Cohn-Bendit, a Franco-German MEP previously representing the Alliance '90/The Greens of Germany, but who ran in France in 2009. Since its creation, the coalition received the support of Cécile Duflot, José Bové and Dominique Voynet amongst others.

After winning a record 16.28% of the vote in the 2009 European elections, the coalition maintained itself to participate in the 2010 regional elections.

In November 2010, the alliance was transformed into a political party under the name Europe Ecology – The Greens (EELV).

Composition

Europe Écologie was made up of the following parties and personalities:

The Greens: Cécile Duflot, Dominique Voynet, Daniel Cohn-Bendit, Gérard Onesta etc.
Federation of Regions and Peoples with Solidarity: Regionalist parties including the Party of the Corsican Nation, Breton Democratic Union and Occitan Party
Civil society: Eva Joly, Laurence Vichnievsky, Philippe Meirieu
Former members of the French Communist Party: Stéphane Gatignon
Alter-globalization activists: José Bové, François Dufour

European Elections 2009

Top Candidates

East: Sandrine Bélier
Île-de-France: Daniel Cohn-Bendit (The Greens)
Massif Central: Jean-Paul Besset
North-West: Hélène Flautre (The Greens)
Overseas: Harry Durimel (The Greens)
South-East: Michèle Rivasi (The Greens)
South-West: José Bové
West: Yannick Jadot

Results

Europe Écologie received 16.28% of the vote nationally, or 2,803,759 votes. It placed only 0.2% behind the Socialist Party (PS) nationally, and ahead of the PS in key regions such as Île-de-France, Provence-Alpes-Côte d'Azur and Rhône-Alpes. This is the highest result won by any green movement, party or coalition in any national French election.

East: 14.27% (Sandrine Bélier)
Île-de-France: 20.86% (Daniel Cohn-Bendit, Eva Joly, Pascal Canfin and Karima Delli)
Massif Central: 13.58% (Jean-Paul Besset)
North-West: 12.10% (Hélène Flautre)
Overseas: 16.25% (no MEPs)
South-East: 18.27% (Michèle Rivasi, François Alfonsi and Malika Benarab-Attou)
South-West: 15.83% (José Bové and Catherine Grèze)
West: 16.65% (Yannick Jadot and Nicole Kiil-Nielsen)

In addition, the smaller green Independent Ecological Alliance won 3.63% of the votes nationally.

2010 Regional elections

Strong from its excellent result in the European elections, the Europe Écologie coalition was renewed around The Greens and associated parties and movements. Europe Écologie decided to run independently in all regions, with the intention of supporting the Left in runoffs. However, the party's ultimate goal was said to be to wrest control of a major region, such as Ile-de-France from the PS. The coalition's candidates included the researcher Philippe Meirieu, magistrate Laurence Vichnievsky, the rural activist François Dufour or Augustin Legrand of the homeless' association Les Enfants de Don Quichotte.

Top Candidates 
Alsace: Jacques Fernique
Aquitaine: Monique De Marco
Auvergne: Christian Bouchardy
Burgundy: Philippe Hervieu
Brittany: Guy Hascoët
Centre: Jean Delavergne
Corsica: No Candidate
Franche-Comté: Alain Fousseret
Guadeloupe: No Candidate
Guyana: José Gaillou
Île-de-France: Cécile Duflot
Languedoc-Roussillon: Jean-Louis Roumegas
Limousin: Ghilaine Jeannot-Pagès
Lorraine: Daniel Béguin
Martinique: No Candidate
Midi-Pyrénées: Gérard Onesta
Nord-Pas-de-Calais: Jean-François Caron
Lower Normandy: François Dufour
Upper Normandy: Claude Taleb
Pays de la Loire: Jean-Philippe Magnen
Picardy: Christophe Porquier
Poitou-Charentes: Françoise Coutant
Provence-Alpes-Côte d'Azur: Laurence Vichnievsky
Réunion: Vincent Defaud
Rhône-Alpes: Philippe Meirieu

Results 
Europe Écologie received 12.19% of the national vote, or 2,373,922 votes, in the first round. The party came third overall behind the Socialist Party and conservative Union for a Popular Movement. It recorded good results in Rhônes-Alpes (17.82%), Île-de-France (16.58%) and Alsace (15.60%).  In the second ballot, Europe Écologie entered joint lists with the Socialist Party, except in Brittany.

References

External links
 Official site of the alliance Europe Ecology – The Greens

Green political parties in France
Left-wing parties in France
Political parties established in 2008
Political parties disestablished in 2010
European Green Party
Political parties of the French Fifth Republic
Defunct political party alliances in France